Chase Addison Clark (August 21, 1883 – December 30, 1966) was an American jurist who served as the 18th governor of Idaho and was a United States district judge of the United States District Court for the District of Idaho.

Education and career
Clark was born on August 21, 1883, in Hadley, Indiana, the son of Eunice (Hadley) and Joseph Addison Clark. He arrived in eastern Idaho Territory in 1884. His father engineered an early canal on the Snake River and later became the first Mayor of Idaho Falls, Idaho in 1900. Clark attended the public schools and left Idaho Falls High School at age 15 and then attended school in Terre Haute, Indiana. Clark returned to Idaho Falls working as a mercantile clerk, then moved to Mackay, Idaho shortly after its founding and saved money to attend the University of Michigan Law School, but did not graduate but instead read law to enter the bar in 1904. He entered private practice in Mackay from 1904 to 1930. He was a Judge Advocate General for the State of Idaho from 1914 to 1915. Clark left to fight in 1916 in the Border War and then World War I. He served in a machine gun unit and achieved the rank of lieutenant in the United States Army. He was a member of the Idaho House of Representatives from 1913 to 1916. He returned to private practice in Idaho Falls from 1930 to 1940. He served in the Idaho Senate from 1933 to 1936. He was the Mayor of Idaho Falls from 1937 to 1938. He was the Governor of Idaho from 1941 to 1942.

Gubernatorial service

Clark was elected Governor as a Democrat in 1940, defeating the Republican incumbent, C. A. Bottolfsen.

At a April 1942 War Relocation Administration conference at Salt Lake City to discuss using Japanese-American internees to help with the farm labor shortage, Governor Clark "went so far as to ask that both Issei and Nisei already residing freely in his state be rounded up and placed under supervision." These citizens of Idaho were not covered by the U.S. Government's order to forcefully removing people of Japanese descent from the west coast. Speaking of the Internment of Japanese Americans in May 1942, months after the Pearl Harbor bombing, Clark spoke in a Lions Club meeting stated "Japs live like rats, breed like rats and act like rats. We don't want them ... permanently located in our state."

As the governor was a two-year term, Bottolfsen then defeated Clark to regain the governorship in 1942; both elections had been very close.

Federal judicial service

Clark was nominated by President Franklin D. Roosevelt on February 18, 1943, to a seat on the United States District Court for the District of Idaho vacated by Judge Charles Cheatham Cavanah. He was confirmed by the United States Senate on March 5, 1943, and received his commission on March 10, 1943. He served as Chief Judge from 1954 to 1964. He assumed senior status on April 30, 1964. His service terminated on December 30, 1966, due to his death.

Family

Clark married Jean Elizabeth Burnett, the 18-year-old daughter of a Mackay merchant, on January 10, 1906.

Clark was a member of a prominent Idaho political family. He was the younger brother of Barzilla W. Clark (1880–1943), who preceded him as governor (1937–1939), and was the father-in-law of Frank Church (1924–1984), a four-term United States Senator (1957–1981) and presidential candidate in 1976. A nephew, David Worth Clark (1902–1955), also represented Idaho in both houses of United States Congress. Clark's daughter, Bethine Clark Church (1923–2013), remained active in Idaho Democratic politics until her death.

Death

Clark suffered a stroke at age 83 in December 1966, and spent his final weeks at St. Luke's Hospital in Boise, Idaho. He died on December 30, and was interred at Rose Hill Cemetery in Idaho Falls.

References

External links

 
 National Governors Association
 Gem of the Mountains, University of Idaho annual: 1942
 
 Mackay, Idaho blog – Chase Clark law office, 1910

1883 births
1966 deaths
Democratic Party governors of Idaho
Mayors of places in Idaho
Democratic Party members of the Idaho House of Representatives
Democratic Party Idaho state senators
Idaho lawyers
Judges of the United States District Court for the District of Idaho
United States district court judges appointed by Franklin D. Roosevelt
20th-century American judges
People from Idaho Falls, Idaho
People from Custer County, Idaho
People from Boise, Idaho
People from Hendricks County, Indiana
Military personnel from Idaho
United States Army officers
University of Michigan Law School alumni
United States federal judges admitted to the practice of law by reading law
20th-century American politicians